Stephen Stills is the debut solo album by American musician Stephen Stills released on Atlantic Records in 1970. It is one of four high-profile albums (all charting within the top fifteen) released by each member of Crosby, Stills, Nash & Young in the wake of their 1970 chart-topping album Déjà Vu, along with After the Gold Rush (Neil Young, September 1970), If I Could Only Remember My Name (David Crosby, February 1971) and Songs for Beginners (Graham Nash, May 1971). It was primarily recorded between CSNY tours in London and Los Angeles. It was released in the United States on November 16, 1970, and in the United Kingdom on November 27, 1970.

The album features many themes common to 1960s' countercultural beliefs, with many songs directly inspired by Stills' on-going and previous relationships with girlfriends and members of CSNY. The album was an immediate commercial success, in both the UK and the US, going top ten and being certified Gold by the Recording Industry Association of America.

Background
The album was mainly recorded at Island Studios in London between the two CSNY tours of 1969 and 1970. Stills had bought a mansion in Surrey, England, for £100,000 called Brookfields, which previously belonged to Ringo Starr, and Peter Sellers. This, on the advice of Ahmet Ertegun, head of Atlantic Records, allowed him to get away from Los Angeles and the deteriorating relationships within CSNY. The songs recorded at Island Studios, include "Old Times, Good Times", "To a Flame" and "Go Back Home". After the 1970 CSNY Tour, Stills recorded a few more songs in LA, and most of the backing vocals. Graham Nash recalled in his book Wild Tales: "Stephen called and said, 'You remember that song of mine, "Love the One You’re With," that I cut in London? Well, I’ve brought the track back and we’re in Wally Heider’s with it. I need voices for the choruses. Any chance you and David would come down?'" In addition to Crosby & Nash, the album features an array of well-known guest musicians, including John Sebastian, Cass Elliot and Rita Coolidge who contributed vocals. Ringo Starr drums on two tracks under the pseudonym "Richie," which he also used for his contribution to the London Sessions album by American bluesman Howlin' Wolf, recorded in England the same year. Stills' album is also the only album to which both Eric Clapton and Jimi Hendrix supplied guitar work. According to Stills, he "bumped into Eric one evening, and he came by and the night degenerated into an endless jam of The Champs’ Tequila. Then we did the album track (Go Back Home) in the studio. His solo was one take and he got a fabulous sound". Also, around this time Clapton recorded the solo for "Fishes and Scorpions" which appeared on Stills' follow-up, Stephen Stills 2. Hendrix added guitar to "Old Times, Good Times" at Island Studios on 15 March 1970. Stills recalled in 1991:

Writing and recording 
The song "We Are Not Helpless" was wrongly assumed by many critics to be a response to Neil Young's song "Helpless" from the Déjà Vu album. "Love the One You're With," Stills' biggest solo hit single, peaked at No. 14 on the Billboard Hot 100 on December 19, 1970, and another single pulled from the album, "Sit Yourself Down," went to No. 37 on March 27, 1971. "Sit Yourself Down" and "Cherokee" are thought to be written about Rita Coolidge, with whom Stills was romantically involved during 1970.  "Do For the Others" was written for David Crosby about the death of his girlfriend Christine Hinton.

Title and packaging 
The front cover photo was taken by photographer Henry Diltz during a snowy September morning outside Stills' cabin in Colorado. The pink giraffe on the cover is thought to be a secret message to one of his girlfriends, specifically Rita Coolidge who had just left him for Graham Nash, which was one of the contributing factors for the demise of CSNY. In the liner notes on the back cover Stills included a poem called “A Child Grew Up On Strings.” by Charles John Quarto Stills dedicated the album to Jimi Hendrix, who had died two months before the album arrived in stores, as to "James Marshall Hendrix".

Release 
The album peaked at No. 3 on the Billboard Top Pop Albums chart in the week of January 2, 1971, during a 39-week run. It was reissued by WEA after being digitally remastered using the HDCD process on December 5, 1995. "We Are Not Helpless" and "Love the One You're With" were first performed in concert on May 12, 1970, during Crosby, Stills, Nash & Young's Déjà Vu tour. In 2009 Crosby, Stills, & Nash released Demos featuring an early demo of "Love the One You're With". It was certified Gold in the USA (RIAA) just eight days after release on November 24, 1970. By 1974, according to Rolling Stone magazine, the album had sold an estimated 800,000 copies in the US alone. Originally this was the highest selling album out of the four high-profile albums released by each member of Crosby, Stills, Nash & Young in the wake of their 1970 chart-topping album Déjà Vu, until it was overtaken by Neil Young's After the Gold Rush. Stills commented it would have been No 1 (most likely on the Record World Charts where at peaked at No 2) if it hadn't been for George Harrison releasing All Things Must Pass at the same time.

Reception 
Reviews of the album were decidedly mixed, ranging from lukewarm to positive. Ed Ward in a contemporary review in Rolling Stone felt that the album had an "elusive" quality, and though he didn't dislike the album, and admired parts, he felt it lacked "meat". However, he felt that "Love the One You're With" would make a "killer single". In another contemporary review, Robert Christgau awarded the album a C+, saying he "effortlessly swings," picking out "Go Back Home" for praise, and is too "damn skillful to put down". Yet he felt there was something "undefined about the record."

However, in three contemporary reviews Record World, Cashbox, and Billboard were full of praise for the album. Record World called Stills "one of the steadiest performers on the rock circuit" and said the "result of the album was stupendous". Cashbox said Stills' "keyboard, guitars and vocals were brilliant" and the songs were "among the best he's ever written". Billboard said Stills was "a complex talent bursting with soul and depth" and "via brilliant arrangements takes rock to new and musical heights." Richard Williams for Melody Maker 1970, said "'Love the One You're With' and 'Sit Yourself Down' are both comfortable and smooth-harmonised songs, which could have come from Deja Vu. 'Church (Part Of Someone)' is a stretched gospel song, maybe the best he's ever written with thick choral responses (I'd dig to hear Lorraine Ellisson singing it)'.

Mick Jagger was quoted in the NME 1970 saying, he's 'been listening to.. and really likes Stills' new album... finding it really funky'. Such was Stephen Stills stature that the two biggest releases for Christmas 1970 were Stephen Stills' debut solo album and George Harrison's All Things Must Pass. Harrison sent Stills a telegram complimenting him on the album.

In a retrospective summary Allmusic calls it "a jaw-dropping experience" just short of Crosby, Stills & Nash and Déjà Vu.

Rankings

In 1974, it was ranked number 70 by the NME writers in their best albums of all time. The album was included in the book 1001 Albums You Must Hear Before You Die. It was voted number 129 in Colin Larkin's All Time Top 1000 Albums in 2000.

Track listing

Personnel

 Stephen Stills – vocals, guitars, bass, piano, organ, steelpan, percussion; horn and string arrangements (3, 4, 7, 9) 
 Jimi Hendrix – electric guitar (4) 
 Eric Clapton – electric guitar (5)
 Booker T. Jones – organ (9); backing vocal (10)
 Calvin "Fuzzy" Samuel – bass (1, 3–6)
 Conrad Isidore – drums (3, 4)
 John Barbata – drums (5, 6) 
 Ringo Starr – drums (7, 10)
 Dallas Taylor – drums (9)
 Jeff Whittaker – congas (1, 4)
 Sidney George – flute, alto saxophone (9)
 Rita Coolidge, David Crosby, Priscilla Jones, John Sebastian – backing vocals (1, 5, 6, 10)
 Cass Elliot, Claudia Lennear – backing vocals (5, 6, 10)
 Graham Nash – backing vocals (1, 6, 10)
 Judith Powell, Larry Steele,  Liza Strike, Tony Wilson – backing vocals (3) 
 Sherlie Matthews – backing vocals (10) 
 Arif Mardin – string arrangements (3, 7)

Additional personnel
 Bill Halverson – producer
 Andy Johns – engineer
 Gary Burden – art direction, back cover photography
 Henry Diltz – front cover photography
 Charles John Quarto – sleeve poem
 Joe Gastwirt – digital remastering

Charts 

Albums

Year-end charts

Singles

Certification

References

External links
 Album online on Radio3Net a radio channel of Romanian Radio Broadcasting Company

1970 debut albums
Stephen Stills albums
Atlantic Records albums
Albums recorded at Record Plant (Los Angeles)
Albums recorded at Wally Heider Studios
Albums produced by Stephen Stills